Giovanni Morandi (12 May 1777 – 23 November 1856) was an Italian organist and composer of the Romantic era.

Life
Morandi was born in Pergola (1777), and died in Senigallia (1856), Italy. He was the most-important Italian composer of organ music in the first half of the 19th century, and was an early mentor of Gioachino Rossini.

Works

Organ music

Sonate per gli organi moderni (I raccolta)
Sonate per gli organi moderni (II raccolta)
Sonate per gli organi moderni (III raccolta)
Sonate per gli organi moderni (IV raccolta)
Sonate per gli organi moderni (V raccolta)
Sonate per gli organi moderni (VI raccolta)
Sonate per gli organi moderni (VII raccolta)
Sonate per gli organi moderni (VIII raccolta)
Sonate per gli organi moderni (IX raccolta)
Sonate per gli organi moderni (X raccolta)
Sonate per gli organi moderni (XI raccolta)
Sonate per gli organi moderni (XII raccolta)
Gran Sinfonia con variazioni
Pastorale coll'imitazione del suono de' zampognari
Il santo Natale
6 Sonate
Pastorale
Nuova Pastorale
Sinfonia in pastorale pel SS. Natale
Raccolta di Sinfonie
Suonate per l'accompagnamento d'una Messa solenne
Marcia militare da eseguirsi nelle processioni
Rondo' con imitazione de' campanelli in Fa
Sinfonia per organo
Pastorale
Gran Raccolta di Sonate per organo di una difficoltà progressiva
2 marce
Due Marcie in onore di Pio IX
1ª Raccolta di Sonate libro I
1ª Raccolta di Sonate libro II
Raccolta di quattro Sonate
Raccolta 2ª di dodici Sonate di facile esecuzione. Fasc. 1
Raccolta 2ª di dodici Sonate di facile esecuzione. Fasc. 2
 Due marce
 Raccolta di Divertimenti e Marcie per Banda militare, eseguiti nelle feste popolari in varie città dello Stato Pontificio, ridotte dall’autore per Organo (o Pianoforte) di facilissima esecuzione

Sources

 Giuseppe Radole, Manuale di letteratura organistica. Dal Trecento al Duemila, Pizzicato, 2005. 
 Giovanni Morandi, Opere per organo a 4 mani. Edizione critica e Catalogo delle opere a stampa per Organo, a cura di Gabriele Moroni, Bologna, UtOrpheus, 2005 ("Collezione Musicale Marchigiana", 3). 
 Giovanni Morandi, Sonate per organo. Prima raccolta (1808), edizione critica a cura di Gabriele Moroni, Ebook, Società Editrice Dante Alighieri, 2012.

External links

 giovannimorandiorgano

1777 births
1856 deaths
19th-century classical composers
People from Pergola, Marche
Italian classical composers
Italian male classical composers
Italian Romantic composers
Composers for pipe organ
19th-century Italian male musicians